Kelly Sullivan is an American politician. She was a Democrat representing the 13th district in the South Dakota House of Representatives.

Political career 

In 2018, Sullivan ran for election to one of two District 13 seats in the South Dakota House of Representatives. She faced two Republicans, incumbent Sue Peterson and Rex Rolfing, in the general election, and Peterson and Sullivan won. She is running for reelection in 2020.

As of July 2020, Sullivan sat on the following committees:
 Commerce and Energy
 Local Government

Electoral record

References 

Year of birth missing (living people)
Living people
Democratic Party members of the South Dakota House of Representatives
21st-century American politicians
21st-century American women politicians
Women state legislators in South Dakota